Fairfield Plantation is an unincorporated community and census-designated place (CDP) in eastern Carroll County, Georgia, United States. The population as of the 2020 census is 4,898.

The community was first listed as a CDP prior to the 2020 census.

Demographics

2020 census

Note: the US Census treats Hispanic/Latino as an ethnic category. This table excludes Latinos from the racial categories and assigns them to a separate category. Hispanics/Latinos can be of any race.

References 

Census-designated places in Carroll County, Georgia
Census-designated places in Georgia (U.S. state)